The 2001–02 Taça de Portugal was the 62nd edition of the Portuguese football knockout tournament, organized by the Portuguese Football Federation (FPF). The 2001–02 Taça de Portugal began on 2 September 2001. The final was played on 12 May 2002 at the Estádio Nacional.

Porto were the previous holders, having defeated Marítimo 2–0 in the previous season's final. Defending champions Porto were eliminated in the quarter finals by Braga. Sporting CP defeated Leixões, 1–0 in the final to win their thirteenth Taça de Portugal. As a result of Sporting CP winning both the league and cup in the same season, cup finalists Leixões would play the Leões in the 2002 Supertaça Cândido de Oliveira.

First round
For the first round draw, teams were drawn against each other in accordance to their geographical location. The draw was split up into four sections: teams from the north, the center, the south and the Azores region. All first round cup ties were played on the 2 September. Ties which ended in a draw were replayed on the 12 September. Due to the odd number of teams at this stage of the competition, Guadalupe progressed to the next round due to having no opponent to face at this stage of the competition. The first round of the cup saw teams from the Terceira Divisão (IV) start the competition alongside some teams who registered to participate in the cup from the Portuguese District Leagues (V).

North Zone

|}

Central Zone

|}

Replays

|}

South Zone

|}

Replays

|}

Azores Zone

|}

Second round
For the second round draw, teams were drawn against each other in accordance to their geographical location. The draw was split up into three sections: teams from the north, the center and the south. The draw for the second round was made on the 18 September, with the ties being played between the 6–7 October. Ties which ended in a draw were replayed on the 17 October. Caçadores das Taipas' tie against Marco was played at a later date due to a scheduling conflict. Due to the odd number of teams at this stage of the competition, Imortal progressed to the next round due to having no opponent to face at this stage of the competition. The second round saw teams from the Portuguese Second Division (III) enter the competition.

North Zone

|}

Replays

Central Zone

|}

Replays

|}

South Zone

|}

Third round
The draw for the third round was made on the 16 October, with the ties being played between the 31 October and the 11 November. Ties which ended in a draw were replayed on the 7–11 November. The third round saw teams from the Liga de Honra (II) enter the competition.

Fourth round
Ties were played on the 16–18 November. Ties which ended in a draw were replayed between the 28 November and the 5 December. Due to the odd number of teams at this stage of the competition, Vitória de Guimarães progressed to the next round due to having no opponent to face at this stage of the competition. The fourth round saw teams from the Primeira Liga (I) enter the competition.

Fifth round
Ties were played on the 5–12 December.
 Ties which ended in a draw were replayed on the 18–19 December.

Sixth round
Ties were played between the 28–29 December to the 9 January. Due to the odd number of teams involved at this stage of the competition, Leixões qualified for the quarter-finals due to having no opponent to face at this stage of the competition.

Quarter-finals
All quarter-final ties were played on the 16–30 January.

Semi-finals
Ties were played on the 6–21 February.

Final

References

Taça de Portugal seasons
Taca De Portugal, 2001-02
2001–02 domestic association football cups